Aliseda is a municipality in the province of Cáceres and autonomous community of Extremadura, Spain.

In 1920 a treasure of great historical significance was found in Aliseda. The discovery of the Treasure of Aliseda in 1920 revealed that the origin of the town belonged to a period before Christ, as it found traces from the Late Bronze Age at the top of the Sierra del Aljibe.

References

Municipalities in the Province of Cáceres